Fate: The Best of Death is a compilation album by Death. It contains songs collected from their first four albums, Scream Bloody Gore (1987), Leprosy (1988), Spiritual Healing (1990) and Human (1991).

Fate was a collection of songs from the first four Death albums controlled by Relativity Records, subsequently purchased by Sony Music Entertainment, and licensed by them to Century Media in Germany. Even though Death was still signed to Relativity at the time of its release, neither Chuck Schuldiner nor the band had any involvement with this release.

Track listing

Personnel 
 Chuck Schuldiner : guitars and vocals (all tracks), bass (tracks 1, 3, 5, 8, 9 and 10)
 Paul Masvidal : guitars (tracks 2 and 6)
 Rick Rozz : guitars (tracks 3, 9 and 10)
 James Murphy : guitars (tracks 4 and 7)
 Steve DiGiorgio : bass (tracks 2 and 6)
 Terry Butler : bass (tracks 4 and 7)
 Chris Reifert : drums (tracks 1, 5 and 8)
 Sean Reinert : drums (tracks 2 and 6)
 Bill Andrews : drums (tracks 3, 4, 7, 9 and 10)

References

Death (metal band) albums
1992 greatest hits albums
Combat Records albums